Coed Cochion Quarry is a Site of Special Scientific Interest (SSSI) in Carmarthenshire, Wales, in which the geology of the site has preserved rare Precambrian fossils.

SSSI

The site is a rare example in the world of Precambrian fossil records - greater than 0.5 billion years old - found in the ashy siltstone sedimentary rock. A number of fossils of medusoid creatures - visually like, but maybe not in fact contemporary jellyfish - are present, as are feeding trails of other creatures. The evidence is that the site was once a sandy, silty shoreline in which soft-bodied fauna became buried.

See also
List of Sites of Special Scientific Interest in Carmarthenshire

References

External links
SSSI Citation for Coed Cochion Quarry
Citation map for Coed Cochion Quarry
Your Special Site and its Future - Coed Cochion Quarry SSSI overview from Natural Resources Wales
Coed Cochion Quarry SSSI marked on DEFRA's MAGIC Map

Quarries in Wales
Precambrian fossils
Sites of Special Scientific Interest in Carmarthen & Dinefwr